Nick the Knife is the third solo album by Nick Lowe, released in 1982 and his first since the 1981 breakup of his band Rockpile.

Background
The record still has several  ties to Rockpile with Lowe's former bandmates Billy Bremner and Terry Williams both playing on the album. The album includes Lowe's  slower remake of the Rockpile song "Heart"; the original version can be found on the band's album Seconds of Pleasure, sung by Bremner.

Nick the Knife reached #50 on the Billboard 200, and #99 on the UK album charts. No singles from the album made the US or UK charts, although in Canada "Stick It Where The Sun Don't Shine" hit the top 40.

Nick the Knife is notable for being one of only two Lowe solo albums with no cover versions, including only songs written or co-written by Lowe, the other album being his 1990 Party of One.

A 1990 CD of the album was issued on Demon Records with the catalog number FIEND CD 183.

The album was reissued by Yep Roc Records in 2017.

Track listing 
All tracks composed by Nick Lowe except where noted.
"Burning" - 2:07
"Heart" (Lowe, Rockpile) – 3:41
"Stick It Where the Sun Don't Shine" – 3:42
"Queen of Sheba" – 2:30
"My Heart Hurts" (Lowe, Carlene Carter) - 2:39
"Couldn't Love You (Any More Than I Do)" – 2:36
"Let Me Kiss Ya" – 2:56
"Too Many Teardrops" (Lowe, Carter) – 2:33
"Ba Doom" – 2:19
"Raining Raining" – 2:45
"One's Too Many (And a Hundred Ain't Enough)" (Lowe, Kim Wilson) – 2:37
"Zulu Kiss" (Lowe, J.E. Ceiling) – 3:22

Bonus tracks from 2017 YepRoc reissue:
"Heart (Demo)" - 3:53
"Raining Raining (Demo)" - 1:55
"I Got a Job" - 3:01

Personnel
Nick Lowe  – vocals, bass, guitar, backing vocals
Bobby Irwin – drums, backing vocals
Terry Williams – drums
Billy Bremner – guitars
Martin Belmont – guitars
Aldo Bocca – guitars, drums on "Heart", engineer
Neill King – piano and Hammond organ, audio grip
Carlene Carter – piano and Hammond organ
Steve Nieve – piano and Hammond organ
Ben Barson – piano and Hammond organ
Paul Carrack – piano and Hammond organ
James Eller – more bass

Singles 
Three songs from the album were released as singles:
"Stick it Where the Sun Don’t Shine" b/w "My Heart Hurts"
"Burning" b/w "Zulu Kiss"
"My Heart Hurts" - released in four versions:
promo b/w same
b/w "Stick it Where the Sun Don’t Shine"
double 45 with three live songs "Pet You and Hold You", "Cracking Up" and "(What’s So Funny ’bout) Peace, Love and Understanding"
b/w "Pet You and Hold You" (Live)

Live versions recorded by Nick Lowe and His Noise To Go, February 10, 1982 at the Agora Ballroom, Cleveland, Ohio

Cover version
In 2015, Justin Remer of Elastic No-No Band recorded covers of all 12 tracks on Nick the Knife with his side project Duck the Piano Wire and released it as the album Duck the Knife: A Homemade Remake of Nick Lowe's "Nick the Knife."

Notes

External links
 

1982 albums
Nick Lowe albums
Albums produced by Nick Lowe
F-Beat Records albums
Columbia Records albums
Yep Roc Records albums